Warren Stormes Hale (1791–1872) was Lord Mayor of London and founder of the City of London School.

Early life
He was born on 2 February 1791, was orphaned and became an apprentice candlemaker or chandler; he was later twice Master of the Tallow Chandlers' Company.

Career
He was elected to the Common Council of the City of London in 1825, as an Alderman in 1856.  he later became Sheriff in 1858 and Lord Mayor in 1864.

He is regarded as the second founder of the City of London School, responsible for using the surplus from the bequest of its original founder, John Carpenter.

Death
He died on 23 August 1872 and is buried at Highgate Cemetery (West).

Sources
 Lord Mayors, Aldermen and Common Councilmen in the Victorian City of London

External links
 Portrait

1791 births
1872 deaths
Burials at Highgate Cemetery
Sheriffs of the City of London
19th-century lord mayors of London
19th-century English politicians